Bonavista South is a former provincial electoral district for the House of Assembly of Newfoundland and Labrador, Canada. As of 2011 the district had 6,843 eligible voters.

It contains the communities of: Bonavista, Spillars Cove, Birchy Cove, Newman's Cove, Amherst Cove, Elliston, Little Catalina, Knights Cove, Stock Cove, King's Cove, Duntara, Keels, Open Hall, Redcliff, Tickle Cove, Plate Cove, Summerville, Princeton, Southern Bay, Charleston, Sweet Bay, Bloomfield, Musgravetown, Musgravetown, Lethbridge, Brooklyn, Portland, Jamestown, Winterbrook, Catalina, Port Union and Melrose.

The district is heavily dependent on the fishery, but agriculture and tourism are significant to the local economy.

The district was abolished in 2015 and largely replaced by the new district of Bonavista.

Members of the House of Assembly
The district has elected the following Members of the House of Assembly:

Election results

|-

|-

|}

|-

|-

|-
 
|NDP
|Sam Kelly
|align="right"|179 
|align="right"|3.27%
|align="right"|

|}

|-

|-

|-
 
|NDP
|Shawn Crann
|align="right"|80
|align="right"| 1.26
|align="right"|
|}

|-

|-

|}

 
|NDP
|Malon Quinton
|align="right"|147
|align="right"|
|align="right"|
|-
|}

 
|NDP
|Rex Sheppard
|align="right"|259
|align="right"|
|align="right"|
|-
|}

 
|NDP
|Harry Clarence Faulkner
|align="right"|519
|align="right"|
|align="right"|
|-
|}

|-
|}

References

External links 
Website of the Newfoundland and Labrador House of Assembly
Newfoundland and Labrador Votes 2007
Newfoundland and Labrador Votes 2003

Newfoundland and Labrador provincial electoral districts